Robert Atkinson Westall (7 October 1929 – 15 April 1993) was an English author and teacher known for fiction aimed at children and young people. Some of the latter cover complex, dark, and adult themes. He has been called "the dean of British war novelists". His first book, The Machine Gunners, won the 1975 Carnegie Medal for the year's outstanding children's book by a British subject. It was named among the top ten Medal-winners at the 70th anniversary celebration in 2007. Westall also won a second Carnegie (no one has yet won three), a Smarties Prize, and the once-in-a-lifetime Guardian Prize.

Early life and career
Robert Westall was born 7 October 1929 in North Shields, Northumberland. He grew up there on Tyneside during the Second World War, which he used as the setting for many of his novels, including his own life. He earned a Bachelor's degree in Fine Art at Durham University and a post-graduate degree in Sculpture at the Slade School of Art in London in 1957. From 1953 until 1955, Westall did national service in the British Army as a Lance Corporal in the Royal Corps of Signals.

Westall then became a teacher, serving as Head of Art and Head of Careers at Sir John Deane's Grammar School in Northwich, Cheshire. Westall acted as a branch director of Samaritans in 1966–1975, while writing for papers such as Cheshire Life and The Cheshire Chronicle, and for The Guardian as an art critic.

Writing
Westall was inspired to be a writer by telling his son Christopher stories about his experiences in the Second World War. His first book, The Machine Gunners, issued by Macmillan in 1975, told a Second World War story about English children who find "a crashed German bomber in the woods complete with machine gun". It was adapted as a BBC television serial in 1983. He returned to its setting in Garmouth, a fictionalised Tynemouth, in other novels, including The Watch House (1977) and Fathom Five (1979), which continues the Machine Gunners story. Christopher was killed in a motorbike accident at the age of 18 in 1978. He became the inspiration for The Devil on the Road (1978), commended for the Carnegie Medal, and for a short story in The Haunting of Chas McGill (1983).

Westall won a second Carnegie Medal for The Scarecrows (Chatto & Windus, 1981). He retired from teaching only in 1985 and tried dealing in antiques before focusing exclusively on writing. For Blitzcat (Bodley Head, 1989) he won the annual Smarties Prize in category 9–11 years, which in 1994 the American Library Association named as one of the hundred Best Books for Young Adults of the Last 25 years. He finally won the once-in-a-lifetime Guardian Children's Fiction Prize for The Kingdom by the Sea (Methuen, 1990). Both that and Gulf (1992) were commended runners-up for the Carnegie Medal. The latter tells of the home front during the Persian Gulf War.

From 1988 until his death Westall attended a writers' circle in Lymm where he helped to assist and mentor new writers.

Death, memorial and legacy
Westall died on 15 April 1993 in Warrington Hospital of respiratory failure from pneumonia. At the time of his death, he lived in lodgings with his landlady, Lindy McKinnel, at 1 Woodland Avenue in the village of Lymm. He had his own cottage a few paces away, which he visited every day to do his writing. Previously he had lived at 20 Winnington Lane, Northwich and run Magpie Antiques, Church Street, Davenham.

As a journalist, Westall wrote for Cheshire Life, the Northwich Chronicle and the Warrington Guardian. A memorial service was held on 29 September 1993, at nearby All Saints' Church, Thelwall, Warrington. Tributes were paid by former teaching colleagues and Miriam Hodgson, editorial director (fiction) of Reed Children's Books. A blue plaque was placed on Westall's birthplace, 7 Vicarage Street, North Shields, the following year. There is also a Westall Walk across locations used by Westall in his stories.

In October 2006, A Trip to Tynemouth by the Japanese animator Hayao Miyazaki was published in Japan. It is based on "Blackham's Wimpy", a story first published in Westall's Break of Dark collection. The rival RAF crews in the story fly Vickers Wellington bombers. The nickname "Wimpy" comes from Wimpy in the Popeye cartoons.

Selected bibliography
According to WorldCat, participating libraries hold editions of Westall's books in 17 foreign languages.

Novels

The Machine Gunners (1975)
The Wind Eye (1976)
The Watch House (1977)
The Devil on the Road (1978)
Fathom Five (1979)
The Scarecrows (1981)
Break of Dark (1982)
Futuretrack Five (1983)
The Haunting of Chas McGill (1983)
The Cats of Seroster (1984)
Rachel and the Angel (1986)
The Creature in the Dark (1988)
Ghost Abbey (1988)
Ghosts and Journeys (1988)
Blitzcat (1989)
The Call and Other Stories (1989)
Old Man on a Horse (1989)
A Walk on the Wild Side (1989)
Echoes of War (1989)
Urn Burial (1989)
If Cats Could Fly (1990)
The Kingdom by the Sea (1990)
The Promise (1990)
Stormsearch (1990)
The Stones of Muncaster Cathedral (1991)
Yaxley's Cat (1991)
Fearful Lovers (1992)
Gulf (1992)
Falling into Glory (1993)
A Place For Me (1993)
Size Twelve (1993)
The Wheatstone Pond (1993)
A Place to Hide (1994)
A Time of Fire (1994)
The Witness (1994)
Blitz (1995)
Christmas Spirit (1995)
The Night Mare (1995)
Blizzard (1996)
Harvest (1996)
Love Match (1997)
Voices in the Wind (1997)
David and the Kittens (2003)

Short fiction collections
 Break of Dark (1982)
 The Haunting of Chas McGill and Other Stories (1983)
 Rachel and the Angel and Other Stories (1986)
 Ghosts and Journeys (1988)
Antique Dust (1989) 
 The Call and Other Stories (1989) (a.k.a. The Call and Other Strange Stories, 2003)The Stones of Muncaster Cathedral (1991) (a.k.a. In Camera and Other Stories, 1992)Fearful Lovers and Other Stories (1992, a.k.a. Fearful Lovers 1993)
 Demons and Shadows: The Ghostly Best of Robert Westall (1993) (a.k.a. The Best of Robert Westall: Volume One: Demons and Shadows, 1999)
Shades of Darkness: More of the Ghostly Best Stories of Robert Westall (1994) (a.k.a. The Best of Robert Westall: Volume Two: Shades of Darkness, 1999)
Christmas Spirit: Two Stories (1994)
Shadows of War (2019)

Nonfiction
Children of the Blitz (1985)
The Making of Me (2006) (autobiographical)

Adaptations

Radio
Hitch-Hiker (first story in Break of Dark), BBC Radio 5 (1990) 
The Machine Gunners, BBC Radio 4 (2002)
The Stones of Muncaster Cathedral, BBC Radio 4 (1996) 
The Wheatstone Pond, BBC Radio 4 (2002)
Yaxley's Cat, BBC Radio 4

Television
The Machine Gunners, BBC (1983) 
The Watch House, BBC (1988)

Awards and honours
American Library Association 100 Best Books for Young Adults of the Last 25 years 
1994: Blitzcat
American Library Association Best Fiction for Young Adults
1997: Gulf

Boston Globe–Horn Book Award runners-up
1977 Honor Book: The Machine Gunners 
1982 Honor Book: The Scarecrows
Carnegie Medal
1975: The Machine Gunners
1981: The Scarecrows
1990 highly commended runner-up: The Kingdom by the Sea
1992 highly commended runner-up: Gulf
1978 commended runner-up: Devil on the Road
Dracula Society Children of the Night Award
1991: The Stones of Muncaster Cathedral 
Guardian Children's Fiction Prize
1991: The Kingdom by the Sea 
Nestlé Smarties Book Prize, age category 9–11 years
1989: Blitzcat
Sheffield Children's Book Award
1991: The Promise

Papers
Robert Westall's papers, deposited between 2003 and 2010, are at Seven Stories, National Centre for Children's Books.

See also

Notes

References

External links

Robert Westall Collection – archive at Seven Stories, the Centre for Children's Books

1929 births
1993 deaths
Military personnel from Northumberland
20th-century British Army personnel
20th-century British novelists
20th-century British short story writers
20th-century educators
20th-century English non-fiction writers
20th-century English novelists
20th-century essayists
Alumni of Durham University
Alumni of the Slade School of Fine Art
Antiques dealers
British autobiographers
British children's writers
British horror writers
British male essayists
British male non-fiction writers
British male short story writers
British writers of young adult literature
Carnegie Medal in Literature winners
English art critics
English autobiographers
English children's writers
English essayists
English horror writers
English non-fiction writers
English short story writers
Ghost story writers
Guardian Children's Fiction Prize winners
Literacy and society theorists
People educated at Sir John Deane's College
People from Northwich
British psychological fiction writers
Royal Corps of Signals soldiers
War writers
Weird fiction writers
Writers of historical fiction set in the modern age